Ara Paiaya is a film producer, director and actor.

Career
Ara Paiaya is a film producer, director and actor. He has produced and directed a number of Hollywood star-driven genre feature films for the worldwide home entertainment market and limited theatrical releases. Ara Paiaya films range from action crime films to comedy. Often featuring martial arts fight scenes and stunt sequences.

Paiaya directed, produced and co-starred in the action feature film Skin Traffik starring Mickey Rourke (The Wrestler), Eric Roberts (The Dark Knight), Daryl Hannah (Kill Bill), Michael Madsen (Reservoir Dogs), Jeff Fahey (Machete), Gary Daniels (The Expendables), Dominique Swain (Lolita), Alan Ford (Snatch) released by Sony Pictures. Paiaya then directed and produced the revenge genre feature film Instant Death starring Lou Ferrigno (The Incredible Hulk) from Sony Pictures.  Paiaya also Directed Purge of Kingdoms starring Angus Macfadyen (Braveheart), Lou Ferrigno (The Incredible Hulk) and Anna Hutchison (The Cabin in the Woods).

Filmography

References

External links 

British film directors
Living people
English-language film directors
British autobiographers
Year of birth missing (living people)